Dudley Head is a snow-covered, prominent ridge projecting into the east side of Beardmore Glacier, surmounted by several domes rising to , about 5 nautical miles (9 km) south of Mount Patrick. It was discovered and named by the British Antarctic Expedition, 1907–09, and called "Mount Dudley" by Ernest Shackleton. The name was amended by the Advisory Committee on Antarctic Names in keeping with the appearance of the feature.

References 

Ridges of the Ross Dependency
Dufek Coast